The Golden Age of Finnish Art coincided with the national awakening of Finland, during the era of the Grand Duchy of Finland under the Russian Empire. It is believed to span an era from the late 19th Century to the early 20th Century, approximately 1880 to 1910. The epic poetry form known as Kalevala, developed during the 19th Century, provided the artistic inspiration for numerous themes at the time, including in visual arts, literature, music and architecture; however, the "Golden Age of Finnish Art" is generally regarded as referring to the realist and romantic nationalist painters of the time. Notable figures of the time include Akseli Gallen-Kallela, Pekka Halonen, Albert Edelfelt, Jean Sibelius, Eino Leino, Helene Schjerfbeck, Emil Wikström, Eero Järnefelt and Eliel Saarinen.

Finnish art became more widely known in Europe at the Paris Exposition of 1900, where the Finnish pavilion was one of the most popular among the attendees.

Artists

There were a number of notable visual artists who are considered to have been part of the Golden Age of Finnish Art.

Painters

The following list of painters does not include artists who are sometimes considered to be part of the Golden Age but generally largely predate it; several notable painters, such as Werner Holmberg, exist in this category. Ferdinand von Wright, the notable Finnish artist whose 1886 The Fighting Capercaillies is considered a seminal Finnish painting, is also regarded as predating the Golden Age. The numerous painters of the Düsseldorf school of painting, such as Berndt Lindholm, Hjalmar Munsterhjelm and Fanny Churberg, may be regarded as Golden Age painters; however, their work is generally associated with an earlier era of artistic development.

Adolf von Becker, however, is regarded as a significant figure to the Golden Age, resulting from his education and tutelage of numerous artists of the era; in addition, Robert Wilhelm Ekman, as an early and notable painter of Kalevala, laid the foundation for similar following works.

{| class="wikitable" style="text-align: center;"
|+ Notable Golden Age painters
|-
! Artist !! Notable work 
|-
| Amélie Lundahl(1850–1914) || Breton Girl Holding a Jar, 1884 (fi)
|-
| Maria Wiik(1853–1928) || Out into the World, 1889
|-
| Albert Edelfelt(1854–1905) || , 1879
|-
| Gunnar Berndtson(1854–1895) || The Bride's Song, 1893 (fi)
|-
| Anna Sahlstén(1859–1931) || Bread Worries, 1895
|-
| Victor Westerholm(1860–1919) || Eckerö Post Quay, 1885 (fi)
|-
| Elin Danielson-Gambogi(1861–1919) || Mother, 1893
|-
| Helene Schjerfbeck(1862–1946) || , 1888
|-
| Venny Soldan-Brofeldt(1863–1945) || Antti, 1907
|-
| Eero Järnefelt(1863–1937) || , 1893
|-
| Akseli Gallen-Kallela(1865–1931) || Lemminkäinen's Mother, 1897
|-
| Pekka Halonen(1865–1933) || The Mower Men, 1891 (fi)
|-
| Ellen Thesleff(1869–1954) || Self-Portrait (fi), 1895
|-
| Magnus Enckell(1870–1925) || Resurrection, Tampere Cathedral, 1907
|-
| Dora Wahlroos(1870–1947) || By the Wash Basin, 1892
|-
| Hugo Simberg(1873–1917) || The Wounded Angel, 1903
|-
|}

Sculptors

Architects

See also
 Finnish art

References

External links

 The Golden Age of Finnish Art, Elina Ojala, University of Tampere.

 
Finnish culture
Finnish art